The 2012 Madison Cash Spiel was held from November 30 to December 2 at the Madison Curling Club in Madison, Wisconsin as part of the 2012–13 World Curling Tour. The event was held in a round robin format.
In the men's final, Pete Fenson won his second consecutive title and fourth title overall with a win over former teammate John Shuster. Fenson defeated Shuster in an extra end with a score of 6–5. In the women's final, Erika Brown defeated Jill Mouzar with a score of 8–7 to win her second consecutive and overall title.

Men

Teams
The teams are listed as follows:

Knockout results
The draw is listed as follows:

A event

B event

C event

Playoffs
The playoffs draw is listed as follows:

Women

Teams
The teams are listed as follows:

Round Robin Standings
Final Round Robin Standings

Tiebreaker

Playoffs
The playoffs draw is listed as follows:

References

External links

Curling competitions in the United States
Curling in Wisconsin
Madison Cash Spiel
Madison Cash Spiel
Madison Cash Spiel